Below is the list of the medalists at the European Junior Badminton Championships since the first edition in 1969.

Individual event
Legend: MS= Men's singles; WS= Women's singles; MD= Men's doubles; WD= Women's doubles; XD= Mixed doubles

Team event

External links

European Junior Badminton Championships
Badminton European Junior Championships